Skovorodinsky District  is an administrative and municipal district (raion), one of the twenty in Amur Oblast, Russia. Its administrative center is the town of Skovorodino. Population:  34,269 (2002 Census);  The population of Skovorodino accounts for 32.4% of the district's total population.

References

Notes

Sources

Districts of Amur Oblast